is a Fukui Railway Fukubu Line railway station located in the city of Fukui, Fukui Prefecture, Japan.

Lines

Station layout
The station consists of two ground-level opposed side platforms connected by a level crossing. There is no station building, but rather two raised platforms in the median of Phoenix-dōri (Prefectural Route 30) from which customers board and disembark.

Adjacent stations

History
On December 11, 1964 Matsumoto-dōri Station abolished and Saibanshomae Station moved 200 meters towards Tawaramachi Station The station was renamed as Jin'ai Joshikōkō Station on March 25, 2010

Surrounding area
 Courts Building: Fukui District Court, Fukui Family Court, Fukui Summary Court
 Fukui Haruyama Government Building
 Fukui Notary Public Office
 Fukui Nishikimachi Post Office
 Fukui Haruyama Post Office
 Fukui Hōei Post Office
 Jin-ai Girls' High School
 Shinmei Shrine
 Fukui Fujita Art Museum
 Fukui Shimbun Sakura-dōri Building
 Fukui City History Museum
 Fukui City Cultural Center
 Fukui Citizens' Welfare Hall
 Fukui Daibutsu
 Jōdo Shinshū Ōtani Sect (Higashi-Honganji) Fukui Branch Temple

See also
 List of railway stations in Japan

References

External links

  

Railway stations in Fukui Prefecture
Railway stations in Japan opened in 1950
Fukui Railway Fukubu Line
Fukui (city)